The Evangeline Parish School Board (EPSB) or Evangeline Parish School District is an entity responsible for the operation of public schools in Evangeline Parish, Louisiana, United States. It is headquartered in the city of Ville Platte. The current Superintendent is Rev. Darwin Lazard, minister at Ninth Baptist Church in Ville Platte.

Schools
Grades 5-12
Basile High School  (Basile)
Mamou High School  (Mamou)
Ville Platte High School  (Ville Platte)
Grades PK-4 & 9-12
Pine Prairie High School  (Pine Prairie)
Grades PK-8
Bayou Chicot Elementary School (Unincorporated area north of Ville Platte)
Chataignier Elementary School (Chataignier)
Vidrine Elementary School (Unincorporated area west of Ville Platte)
Grades PK-4
Mamou Elementary School (Mamou)
Ville Platte Elementary School (Ville Platte)
W.W. Stewart Elementary School (Basile)
Grades PK-2
James Stephens Montessori School (Ville Platte)
Other Campuses
Evangeline Central/Social Skills and Academic Center (Unincorporated area west of Ville Platte near Vidrine Elementary School)

Demographics

Total Students (as of October 1, 2007): 6,120
Gender
Male: 52%
Female: 48%
Race/Ethnicity
White: 57.75%
African American: 40.98%
Hispanic: 0.75%
Asian: 0.31%
Native American: 0.21%
Socio-Economic Indicators
At-Risk: 76.39%
Free Lunch: 66.29%
Reduced Lunch: 10.10%

See also
List of school districts in Louisiana

References

External links
Evangeline Parish School Board - Official site.

School districts in Louisiana
Education in Evangeline Parish, Louisiana